Inshegra  is a small crofting village, located two miles south east of Badcall and lies at the south east coast of Loch Inchard, in Lairg, Sutherland, Scottish Highlands and is in the Scottish council area of Highland.

References

Populated places in Sutherland